Nuria Barrios (born 1962) is a Spanish writer. She was born in Madrid. Her work spans genres, including both fiction and non-fiction.

Her poetry collection El hilo de agua (Algaida, 2004) won the Premio Ateneo de Sevilla. Among her other works are the short story collections Amores patológicos (Ediciones B, 1998 / Punto de Lectura, 2002) and El zoo sentimental (Alfaguara, 2000 / Punto de  Lectura, 2002). She has also written a travel book titled Balearia (Plaza y Janés, 2000). Her work has appeared in numerous anthologies. She has been translated into Dutch, Italian, Portuguese, Croatian and Esperanto. She contributes regularly to Babelia, the literary supplement of El País.

Following the success of her novel El alfabeto de los pájaros (Seix Barral, 2011), she published another book of poems Nostalgia de Odiseo (Vandalia, 2012). Her latest work is the short story collection Ocho centímetros (Páginas de Espuma, 2015).

Selected works
 Ocho centímetros
 El alfabeto de los pájaros
 Nostalgia de Odiseo
 El zoo sentimental
 Amores patológicos
 Balearia
 El hilo de agua

References

Writers from Madrid
1962 births
21st-century Spanish novelists
Spanish women poets
Spanish women short story writers
Spanish short story writers
Living people
21st-century Spanish women writers
21st-century short story writers